Marvin Burns (born May 13, 1962), known by his stage name Li'l Louis (sometimes expanded to Li'l Louis & the World and Li'l Louis & the Party), is a Chicago-born house-music producer and DJ . He scored a number of hits on the Billboard Hot Dance Music/Club Play chart in the 1980s and 1990s, three of which hit #1.<ref>IMO Records.  "Lil Louis Biography"], IMO Records' Retrieved on March 8, 2011.</ref>

His best known song, "French Kiss" spent two weeks at No. 1 on the U.S. Hot Dance Music/Club Play chart in 1989. Originally an instrumental, the track features a several-minutes-long breakdown in which the tempo gradually slows down to a stop. As the song gained popularity, vocals by Shawn Christopher were added. Even with its erotic sound, it crossed over to some pop radio stations and climbed to No. 50 on the Billboard Hot 100. It was a big success throughout Europe reaching No. 2 in the UK Singles Chart, despite being banned by the BBC, and in Germany, and No. 1 in the Netherlands. The video was directed by Marek Budzynski. British Drum 'n' Bass producers Ed Rush & Optical later produced a remix.

In the track "Teachers" from the 1997 Homework album by Daft Punk, Lil Louis is one of the many musicians mentioned.

Laurent Garnier's 1997 single "Flashback" contained a remix made by Lil Louis called "Lil Louis Civilized Instrumental Painting."

In 2000, fellow producer Josh Wink released "How's Your Evening So Far?"—credited to Wink Featuring Lil Louis—a track that heavily sampled "French Kiss". The song peaked at No. 3 on the dance chart. The song was also sampled in 2000 by hip hop emcee Lil' Kim on the track "Custom Made (Give It To You)," which was featured on The Notorious KIM.

In 2013, John Legend released the song "Made to Love", which features a prominent sample of the Lil' Louis song "Video Clash", on Kanye West's G.O.O.D. Music label.

On January 24, 2015, Louis suffered permanent sound-induced hearing loss in his left ear during a soundcheck in Manchester, England, when a compressed air horn was let off in close proximity to him.

Discography
Albums
 From the Mind of Lil Louis (FFRR/PolyGram UK; Epic/SME Records US, 1989)
 Li'l Louis & the World – Journey with the Lonely'' (Epic/SME Records US, 1992)

Singles

See also

List of number-one dance hits (United States)
List of artists who reached number one on the US Dance chart

References

American dance musicians
American electronic musicians
American house musicians
Musicians from Chicago
DJs from Chicago
Epic Records artists
Living people
FFRR Records artists
1962 births
Electronic dance music DJs